William Nash may refer to:
William Nash (VC) (1824–1875), Irish recipient of the VC
William Nash (Lord Mayor of London), grocer and politician in 18th century London
William Nash (Manitoba politician) (1846–1917), lawyer and politician in Manitoba, Canada
William F. Nash, member of the Wisconsin State Senate
William Heddle Nash (1894–1961), English lyric tenor
William L. Nash, U.S. Army general
William Nash (cricketer) (1884–1971), English cricketer
William Nash, character in American Yearbook
Bill Nash (footballer) (1882–1962), Australian rules footballer
Billy Nash (1865–1929), Major League Baseball third baseman